The Sons of Eilaboun is a 2007 documentary film by Palestinian artist and film maker Hisham Zreiq (Zrake), that tells the story of the Eilabun massacre, which was committed by the Israeli army during Operation Hiram in October 1948. Eilaboun is a village in the Northern Galilee between Nazareth and the Sea of Galilee. In the incident, fourteen men were killed and twelve of them were executed. The villagers were expelled to Lebanon and became refugees for few months, before being allowed to return in 1949 as part of an agreement between the state of Israel and Archbishop Maximos V Hakim.

The film is the story of the film maker's family, and specially his father's story. Hisham Zreiq explained why he made the film when he said "He choked and his eyes were full of tears, and with a trembling voice he said 'I remember it as if it has just happened' -- this is the way he ended the story, the story of a nine-year-old boy from a small village called Eilaboun, in Palestine 1948, the story of my father, when he was a refugee".

Hisham Zreiq was acknowledged by Ramiz Jaraisy, the mayor of Nazareth and by Hana Sweid, an Israeli Arab politician and member of the Knesset from Eilaboun, where Jaraisy described the film as an important work that tells the Palestinian story in a contrast with the dominant Israeli version. 
Gilad Atzmon, an Israeli-born British, political activist and writer, wrote in an article: "Zreiq manages to deliver a very deep and authentic reading of Palestinian history. He also manages to portray the intense emotional impact of the Nakba on those who survived the horror."

Synopsis
The film starts with Melia Zreiq, an old woman from Eilaboun, saying: "I hope God will bring peace to this land, and let the peoples live together - a good life. I hope there will be peace". Historian Ilan Pappe talks about Plan Dalet, a plan that David Ben-Gurion and the Haganah leaders in Palestine worked out during autumn 1947 to spring 1948. Pappe discusses the details of the plan, and how was it carried out. On October 30, 1948, the Israeli army entered Eilaboun at approximately 5 AM. They then forced the villagers together in the main square of the village. They chose seventeen young men. Five of them were taken as human shield, and the rest of the twelve were killed, each in a different location. This all happened after the expulsion of the rest of the village to Lebanon, where they became refugees after a five days forced march to Lebanon. After a United Nations peace keeper observed and reported Israel was forced to allow the people back.

Awards and festivals 
The film won the Al-Awda award in Palestine 2008, and was screened in several festivals and events, such as:

 Sixth Annual International Al-Awda Convention 2008, California, United States 
 Boston Palestine Film Festival 2008, United States 
 International İzmir Short Film Festival 2008, Izmir, Turkey
 Amal The International Euro-Arab film Festival 2008, Spain 
 Carthage Film Festival 2008 (Palestine: To remember section), Carthage, Tunisia
 Regards Palestiniens, Montreal, Canada 
 Chicago Palestine Film Festival, Chicago, USA 
 13th Annual Arab Film Festival, Los Angeles, USA 
 Sixth Twin Cities Arab Film Festival, Minnesota, USA 
 Palestine Film Festival in Madrid, 2010, Spain 
 Al Ard Doc Film Festival, 2011, Cagliari, Italy 
 Toronto Palestine Film Festival, 2012, Toronto, Canada

See also
List of Palestinian films

References

External links 
 
 
 Hisham Zreiq's film Sons of Eilaboun: introduction by Gilad Atzmon
 The sons of Eilaboun in Hisham Zreiq's official Website
 The sons of Eilaboun in Amazon
 When it all began (The long version of The sons of Eilaboun)

Films about the 1948 Palestinian exodus
2007 films
2000s Arabic-language films
2000s English-language films
Palestinian documentary films
Documentary films about the Israeli–Palestinian conflict
German short documentary films
2007 short documentary films
1948 Arab–Israeli War
Films set in 1948
Films about forced migration
2007 multilingual films
German multilingual films
2000s German films